Justice Chaudhury  is a 1983 Hindi film, produced by G.A. Seshagiri Rao under the Padmalaya Studios banner, presented by Krishna and directed by K. Raghavendra Rao. The film stars Jeetendra, Sridevi, Hema Malini, Moushumi Chatterjee and music of the film was composed by Bappi Lahiri. The film is a remake of Telugu blockbuster movie Justice Chowdary (1982), which also stars Sridevi in the same role.

Plot
Advocate R. K. Chaudhary (Jeetendra), a disciple of justice, prosecutes Shankar Singh (Shakti Kapoor) for murder case, who is the twin brother of a dangerous gangster Jai Singh (also Shakti Kapoor) and the case is defended by Chaudhary's opponent Kailash (Kader Khan). Chaudhary wins the case and Shankar Singh is sentenced to death. Jai Singh swore to take revenge from Chaudhary when Kailash also joins him and they hang to repay. Chaudhary leads a happy family life with his ideal wife Janki (Moushumi Chatterjee), son Inspector Ramesh (Arun Govil), daughter-in-law Lata, and daughter Laxmi (Debashree Roy), a dumb girl. Parallelly, Ramu (also Jeetendra) a young & energetic guy, resembles Chaudhary, is a motor mechanic & a racer and he loves Kailash's daughter Rekha (Sridevi). Recognizing Ramu's caliber, Jai Singh & Kailash misuse him for their criminal activities which he too accepts to fulfill his life ambition of constructing a house for his mother Radha (Hema Malini), who is under prison for the crime he committed. Meanwhile, Chaudhary becomes High Court Chief Justice which evildoers couldn't abide, so they get Laxmi married to their acolyte Gopal (Raj Kiran) to exploit Chaudhary but he stands strong even Gopal necks out Laxmi. At the same time, Kailash discovers Ramu is Justice Chaudhary's son, so they again incite him by creating Chaudhary as a deceiver of his mother and provokes Ramu against Chaudhary to take revenge. Now Ramu indicts Ramesh in a crime by changing his attire as Chaudhary and in the court, Chaudhary compelled to sentence life imprisonment to him. Thereafter, Chaudhary starts digging the matter when he finds out Radha is alive & Ramu is his son. Then he recalls the past, Chaudhary & Radha were love birds in college and just before their marriage, Radha goes missing. Later he ascertains herself as dead. Hence on the advice of his Diwanji, he reconciles with life and marries Janki. At present, Chaudhary decides to affirm the truth but due to Janki's health condition, he holds back. In the meantime, Radha is released from prison. Chaudhary meets her, learns that she has intentionally left his life being aware of Janki's love when Chaudhary understands her virtue and also divulges Ramu's credulity. At that point of time, evil-minded Jai Singh seizes Chaudhary's family even Kailash also double-crossed by him. Here Chaudhary gamely breaks out his play. Simultaneously, knowing the truth, Ramu realizes his mistake and goes for his father's aid. At last, both of them see the end of Papa Rao when Radha sacrifices her life to save Chaudhary. Finally, the movie ends a happy note with the marriage of Ramu & Rekha.

Cast

Jeetendra as Justice R. K. Chaudhary / Ramu (Double Role) 
Sridevi as Rekha
Hema Malini as Radha 
Moushumi Chatterjee as Janki
Raj Kiran as Gopal
Shakti Kapoor as Jai Singh / Shankar Singh (Double Role)
Kader Khan as Advocate Kailash
Arun Govil as Inspector Ramesh
Debashree Roy as Laxmi
Asrani as Alexander Onassis Anthony
Prema Narayan as Alexander's Girlfriend
Bharat Bhushan as Jagannath
Satyendra Kapoor as Dr. Murthy
Manmohan Krishna

Soundtrack

References

External links
 

1983 films
1980s Hindi-language films
Films directed by K. Raghavendra Rao
Films scored by Bappi Lahiri
Hindi remakes of Telugu films
Indian action drama films
1980s action drama films